Alaviq (also Romanized as ‘Alavīq; also known as Alyavi) is a village in Peyghan Chayi Rural District, in the Central District of Kaleybar County, East Azerbaijan Province, Iran. At the 2006 census, its population was 23, in 7 families.

References 

Populated places in Kaleybar County